Endless Seasons is the fourth studio album by Canadian folk music group The Rankin Family. It was released by EMI on August 29, 1995. The album peaked at number 6 on the RPM Country Albums chart.

Track listing
"As I Roved Out" (Traditional) – 3:37
"The River" (Cookie Rankin) – 3:34
"Natives" (Paul Doran) – 4:01
"Òganaich an òr-Fhuilt Bhuidhe/Am Bràighe (Youth Whose Hair Is Golden)" (Malcolm Gillis, Traditional) – 3:31
"Forty Days and Nights" (Jimmy Rankin) – 4:57
"Eyes of Margaret" (John Morris Rankin) – 4:44
"You Feel the Same Way Too" (Jimmy Rankin) – 4:50
"Endless Seasons" (Jimmy Rankin) – 4:16
"Padstow" (Traditional) – 3:08
"Blue-Eyed Suzie" (John Morris Rankin) – 3:48
"Your Boat's Lost at Sea" (Jimmy Rankin) – 5:21

Chart performance

References

1995 albums
The Rankin Family albums
EMI Records albums